Hasanabad (also Romanized as Ḩasanābād) is a village in Ahmadabad Rural District, Takht-e Soleyman District, Takab County, West Azerbaijan Province, Iran. At the 2006 census, its population was 1,467, in 266 families.

References 

Populated places in Takab County